Sarah Jane Smith: Ghost Town is a Big Finish Productions audio drama based on the long-running British science fiction television series Doctor Who. It stars Elisabeth Sladen reprising her role as Sarah Jane Smith.

Plot 
Sarah Jane arranges for Juno Baker to sell the property at Morton Harwood, which she inherited from Aunt Lavinia, to finance her ongoing investigations. As a first step, Sarah Jane travels to Romania to meet an old journalist friend at an international peace conference, whose delegates are being literally scared to death. But she finds to her dismay that someone is trying to do the same to her.

Attempting to discover the truth behind the Project CIA conspiracy, she encounters the mysterious Dimitri: a man with no name and no past, who has complete amnesia.

Cast
Sarah Jane Smith – Elisabeth Sladen
Yolande Benstead – Ingrid Evans
Abbotly – Brian Miller
Josh Townsend – Jeremy James
Candy McElroy – Elizabeth Faulkner
Jack McElroy – Robert Jezek
Professor Vodancski – Mark Donovan

Trivia
Brian Miller (Abbotly) is the husband of Elisabeth Sladen (Sarah Jane Smith) and the father of Sadie Miller (Natalie Redfern). He previously appeared as Dugdale in the 1983 serial Snakedance and provided Dalek voices in Resurrection of the Daleks and Remembrance of the Daleks.
Brendan Richards, who appeared in the 1981 spin-off special K-9 and Company, is said to be working in Silicon Valley. In Comeback, it's mentioned that he is in San Francisco and therefore unable to attend Aunt Lavinia's funeral.

External links
Big Finish Productions – ''Sarah Jane Smith: Ghost Town

Ghost Town
2002 audio plays